Diadasia is a genus of bees in family Apidae. Species of Diadasia are oligolectic, specialized on a relatively small number of plant species. 

Their host plants include asters, bindweeds, cacti, mallows, and willowherbs, although mallows are the most common and likely ancestral host plant for the whole genus. Its tribe is Emphorini.
In the Sonoran Desert, Diadasia rinconis is considered the "cactus bee" as it feeds almost exclusively on a number of Sonoran Desert cactus species, its life cycle revolving around the flowering of the native species of cacti.

Species
These 42 species belong to the genus Diadasia.

References 

Hymenoptera of North America
Fauna of the Western United States
Insects of Mexico
Apinae
Bee genera